Leptodactylus gracilis is a species of frog in the family Leptodactylidae.
It is found in Argentina, Bolivia, Brazil, Paraguay, and Uruguay.
Its natural habitats are subtropical or tropical moist shrubland, temperate grassland, subtropical or tropical dry lowland grassland, subtropical or tropical seasonally wet or flooded lowland grassland, intermittent freshwater marshes, pastureland, rural gardens, and urban areas.

References

gracilis
Amphibians described in 1841
Taxa named by André Marie Constant Duméril
Taxonomy articles created by Polbot